Harvey Leigh Cantwell (born 28 January 1999), also known by his stage name Hrvy (stylised in all caps as HRVY), is an English singer and television personality. He was a presenter on Friday Download on CBBC from 2014 to 2015, and competed on Strictly Come Dancing in 2020.

Education 
Cantwell is a former student of the Leigh Academy in Dartford, Kent, leaving in 2015.

Career

Television 
Cantwell appeared as one of six presenters of the CBBC television show Friday Download for Series 7 to Series 9. In 2017, he played the role of Miles on the American web series Chicken Girls in its first season. On 26 February 2020, he appeared in an episode of the CBBC singing show Got What It Takes? by surprising the contestants as they were learning his own song "Personal" for that week's sing-off. He was also a mentor in the same episode during a music video challenge.

In September 2020, it was announced that he would be competing in the eighteenth series of Strictly Come Dancing, partnered with Janette Manrara. They were the first pair to receive a 10 from any judge in the series for their Salsa in Week 4, and scored the first perfect 30/30 of the series in Week 6 for their Street routine. (Due to the ongoing COVID-19 pandemic, Bruno Tonioli was unable to travel to the UK to take part as a judge, hence the maximum score was only 30 rather than the usual 40.) They finished top of the judges' leaderboard on three occasions, the most of any couple in the series, and also placed joint-first on the judges' leaderboard in the grand-final, scoring a total of 88 out of 90. With the exception of eventual winners Bill Bailey and Oti Mabuse, they were the only other couple in the series to never place in the bottom two during any week. The duo eventually finished in second place alongside Jamie Laing and Karen Hauer, Maisie Smith and Gorka Márquez, losing out to Bill Bailey and Oti Mabuse on the public vote.

Music 
HRVY's music career began on 20 December 2013 with the release of his first single, "Thank You".
In May 2014, he was a support artist for Little Mix during the Salute Tour alongside girlband M.O. After signing with Virgin EMI in February 2017, he released his debut Holiday EP which featured the singles "Holiday" and "Phobia". In November 2017, he released the Talk to Ya EP that included the single "Personal". In February 2018, HRVY was named in The Courier and Newcastle Student Radio's The Sounds of 2018 at number six, alongside Rex Orange County, Brockhampton, and SG Lewis. In April 2018, he was a support artist for the Vamps during the Night and Day Tour alongside Jacob Sartorius, New Hope Club, Maggie Lindemann, and Conor Maynard. On 25 April 2018, he released the single "Hasta Luego", featuring Cuban-American singer Malú Trevejo. In September 2018, he released "I Wish You Were Here", promoted with a performance at BBC Radio 1's Teen Awards. HRVY was also named on BBC Radio 1's Brit List at that time. That same year, he was listed in CelebMixs Top Success Stories of 2018, along with his management company, Alphadog Management.

In June 2019, he collaborated with South Korean group NCT Dream under SM Entertainment. The song, "Don't Need Your Love", was released on 6 June 2019. HRVY was set to release his debut studio album, Can Anybody Hear Me?, on 20 November 2020, though it was cancelled due to not feeling it was the right time.
 
In September 2021, he released the single "Runaway with It" that samples Shanice's 1991 hit "I Love Your Smile", which he performed at the 26th National Television Awards. On 17 December, it was announced that he would be joining the Wanted on their Most Wanted: The Greatest Hits UK Tour in the new year.

On 28 January 2022, his third extended play, Views from the 23rd Floor, was released to coincide with his 23rd birthday. The two tracks, "Talking to the Stars" and "Golden Hour", preceded the EP. Followed by this was the collaboration song "Save Me" with American DJ and record producer Steve Aoki; its official music video released the same day on 29 April. He released the single "I Wish I Could Hate You" on 5 August, named as the first song he released that he wrote by himself.

Discography

Extended plays

Singles

Guest appearances

Music videos

Awards and nominations

Notes

References

1999 births
Living people
English male singers
English pop singers
English television presenters
Musicians from Kent
21st-century English singers
21st-century British male singers
Virgin EMI Records artists